Shay McClure is an American football coach.  He was the head football coach at Dixie State University in St. George, Utah, a position he had held since the 2016 season.  His contract for 2019 was not renewed.  McClure served as the interim head football coach at Southern Oregon University in Ashland, Oregon for one seasons, in 2005, compiling record of 1–9.

Head coaching record

References

External links
 Dixie State profile

Year of birth missing (living people)
Living people
American football defensive backs
Utah Tech Trailblazers football coaches
Humboldt State Lumberjacks football coaches
Occidental Tigers football coaches
San Diego Toreros football coaches
Southern Oregon Raiders football coaches
Southern Oregon Raiders football players
People from Siskiyou County, California
Players of American football from California